Cassius Marcellus Clay may refer to:
Cassius Marcellus Clay (politician) (1810–1903), American politician and abolitionist
Cassius Marcellus Clay Sr. (1912–1990), American painter and musician, named after the abolitionist, father of the boxer
Cassius Marcellus Clay Jr. or Muhammad Ali (1942–2016), American boxer